Floyd is a surname of Welsh origin, deriving from Lloyd, which is ultimately an anglicized spelling of "Llwyd" (“gray, gray-haired”), and of Scottish origin deriving from Flood. Notable people with this surname include:

Notable people
 Andress Small Floyd (1873–1933), founder of the Self-Master Colony
 Benjamin Rush Floyd, American politician
 Bubba Floyd (1917–2000), American baseball player
 Carlisle Floyd (1926–2021), American opera composer
 Charles Floyd (disambiguation), several people
 Christiane Floyd (born 1943), Austrian computer scientist
 Cliff Floyd (born 1972), retired American Major League Baseball player
 Darrell Floyd (c. 1933 – 2000), American college basketball player
 Davis Floyd (1776–1834), American politician convicted of conspiring with Aaron Burr
 Eddie Floyd (born 1937), American R&B/soul singer-songwriter
 Elson S. Floyd (1956–2015), 10th president of Washington State University
 Emily Floyd (born 1972), Australian public artist, sculptor and printmaker
 Gavin Floyd (born 1983), Major League Baseball pitcher
 George Floyd (1973–2020), African-American man who was murdered during a police arrest
 George Floyd (American football) (born 1960), American football player
 George Rogers Clark Floyd, American politician
 James Floyd (disambiguation), several people
 Jehyve Floyd (born 1997), American basketball player in the Israeli Basketball Premier League
 John Floyd (disambiguation), several people
 Keith Floyd (1943–2009), British chef
 Malcolm Floyd (born 1972), retired American football player
 Malcom Floyd (born 1981), American football player
 Pretty Boy Floyd (Charles Arthur Floyd, 1904–1934), American bank robber
 Raymond Floyd (born 1942), American golfer
 Robert W. Floyd (1936–2001), computer scientist
 Sally Floyd (1950–2019), computer scientist
 Sleepy Floyd (Eric Augustus Floyd, born 1960), American professional basketball player
 Stanley Floyd (born 1961), American track and field sprinter
 William Floyd (1734–1821), American signer of the Declaration of Independence
 William Floyd (American football), retired American football fullback

Fictional characters
 Heywood R. Floyd, in the Space Odyssey series by Arthur C. Clarke
 Sally Floyd (comics), reporter in the Marvel Comics universe
 Pink Floyd, protagonist of the 1979 concept album The Wall by the band Pink Floyd
 Lt. Robert "Bob" Floyd in Top Gun: Maverick

References

Anglicised Welsh-language surnames